Athletic Park is a former baseball and American football stadium located in Duluth, Minnesota.  Constructed in 1903, the park was the home of the Duluth White Sox (1903–1916, 1934) and the Duluth Dukes (1935–1940). The stadium was also home to the Duluth Kelleys/Eskimos of the National Football League (1923–1926). It had a capacity of 6,000 spectators.  It was demolished and replaced by Wade Stadium in 1941.

References

American football venues in Minnesota
Defunct National Football League venues
Buildings and structures in Duluth, Minnesota
Baseball venues in Minnesota
Defunct minor league baseball venues
1903 establishments in Minnesota
Sports venues completed in 1903
1941 disestablishments in Minnesota
Sports venues demolished in 1941
Sports venues in the Duluth–Superior metropolitan area